"Home Lovin' Man" is a song written by Roger Cook, Roger Greenaway, and Tony Macaulay and performed by Andy Williams.  The song reached #7 in the UK and #10 on the adult contemporary chart in 1970.

The song was also covered by Tony Christie on his 1971 Tony Christie album (MCA MKPS 2016) and by Roger Whittaker as the title track for his 1979 album Home Lovin' Man (Tembo 841 165-2).

References

1970 singles
Songs written by Roger Cook (songwriter)
Songs written by Roger Greenaway
Songs written by Tony Macaulay
Andy Williams songs
Columbia Records singles
1970 songs
Song recordings produced by Dick Glasser